Francisco "Paquito" Joglar Herrero (May 12, 19225 October 1957) was a Puerto Rican medical technologist and civic leader.

Francisco Joglar Herrero nicknamed "Paquito", was born on May 12, 1922, in the town of Corozal, Puerto Rico. His parents were Francisco Joglar Rodriguez and Angelina Herrero Calderon. At an early age, his family moved to the city of Bayamón, Puerto Rico where he attended elementary as well as High School. He served in the United States Army in the Medical Department during World War II. In 1947, Francisco Joglar married Elsa Pesquera Umpierre. 

Early on, he distinguished himself as a community and civic leader in various organizations such as the Lions Club, Colonia Hispanoamericana, the Catholic Church and the Vaqueros de Bayamón Fan Club. He was a founding member of the Alpha Chi Beta fraternity Bayamon chapter. 

He worked with the Boy Scouts of America Puerto Rico Council, serving as founding member of the Order of the Arrow chapter in Puerto Rico. For his service to BSA, he was honored with the Silver Beaver Award. 

He died on 5 October 1957 due to a car accident and is buried at the Puerto Rico National Cemetery in Bayamón, Puerto Rico.

Posthumous honors
In his honor, a street in Bayamón is named after him. An oil painting portrait of Francisco Joglar Herrero is on permanent display at the "Galeria de Bayamoneses Ilustres" at the Interamerican University of Puerto Rico Bayamon Campus. The "Paquito Joglar" cabin in Puerto Rico's Guajataka Scout Reservation was named after him.

References

1922 births
1957 deaths
20th-century Puerto Rican people
People from Corozal, Puerto Rico
Puerto Rican Roman Catholics
United States Army personnel of World War II
United States Army soldiers
Road incident deaths in Puerto Rico